Georgios Kolokoudias(born 3 May 1989) is a Cypriot football striker. He plays for Ayia Napa.

In the past he played for Digenis Akritas Morphou, Olympiakos Nicosia, Enosis Neon Paralimni and Panserraikos in Greece. He trialed for English League One side Swindon Town FC in July 2009 before signing for Olympiakos.

External links

 

1989 births
Living people
Cypriot footballers
Cyprus international footballers
Cyprus under-21 international footballers
Cyprus youth international footballers
Association football forwards
Enosis Neon Paralimni FC players
Panserraikos F.C. players
Olympiakos Nicosia players
Digenis Akritas Morphou FC players
Anagennisi Deryneia FC players
Ayia Napa FC players
Apollon Limassol FC players
Nea Salamis Famagusta FC players
Cypriot First Division players
Cypriot Second Division players
Cypriot expatriate footballers
Expatriate footballers in Greece
People from Famagusta District